Eros Pisano (born 31 March 1987) is an Italian footballer who plays as a full-back.

Club career

Varese
Pisano started his career at hometown club Varese, and won the Serie D Group A championship and was promoted. He also played for Varese in Eccellenza in 2004–05 season, played in the national promotion playoffs.

In 2006–07 season, he made his professional debut in Serie C2, completing the season in 11th place. In July 2007 he was sold to Serie B team Pisa in co-ownership deal. However, he only played 7 times in the second division, including once in the relegation playoffs.

In the next season he returned to Varese. Varese gave up the remain 50% rights to Pisa in June 2008, and he returned to Varese in a co-ownership deal in August. In June 2009 Varese acquired the remaining 50% of Pisano's transfer rights from Pisa, and he proved to be instrumental as his team became Lega Pro Seconda Divisione Group A champions in 2008–09 and then won the 2009–10 Lega Pro Prima Divisione playoffs, thus ensuring two consecutive promotions in a row. In the 2010–11 Serie B, Pisano appeared in 40 league games out of 42, and his team surprised once again as Varese ended the regular season in fourth place, then losing the promotion playoff semi-finals to Padova.

Palermo and Genoa
On 8 June 2011 Serie A team Palermo announced the signing of Pisano from Varese for €1.85 million. He made his debut in Serie A on 11 September 2011 in a 4–3 victory against Inter.

In January 2013 he was sold to Genoa in a co-ownership exchange deal for Brazilian defensive midfielder Anselmo. He returned to Palermo in June after the Sicilians, then relegated to Serie B, re-acquired full ownership of his transfer rights in a blind auction for €531,000, in a three-year contract.

Hellas Verona
On 2 February 2015 he moved permanently to Verona, initially on a temporary deal. He was sold for free.

Bristol City
On 27 June 2017, Bristol City announced the signing of the free agent on a two-year deal, effectively on 1 July. He started the first five games of the season, before firstly a knee injury kept him out for six weeks and then a torn hamstring ruled him out for 4 months. He was released by Bristol City at the end of the 2018–19 season.

Return to Pisa
On 23 January 2020 he signed with Serie B club Pisa.

Feralpisalò
On 31 August 2021 he joined to Serie C club Feralpisalò.

Representative career
He was capped once for Serie C under-20 representative team in 2006–07 Mirop Cup. He also capped for "U-20 Serie C" at Serie C Quadrangular Trophy, winning representative teams of Serie C2 Group B and C.

Career statistics

Honours
 Lega Pro Seconda Divisione: 2009
 Serie D: 2006

References

External links
 La Gazzetta dello Sport 2007–08 Profile 
 Football.it Profile 

1987 births
Living people
Footballers from Lombardy
Italian footballers
Association football fullbacks
Serie A players
Serie B players
Serie C players
Serie D players
S.S.D. Varese Calcio players
Pisa S.C. players
Palermo F.C. players
Genoa C.F.C. players
Hellas Verona F.C. players
FeralpiSalò players
English Football League players
Bristol City F.C. players
Italian expatriate footballers
Italian expatriate sportspeople in England
Expatriate footballers in England
Sportspeople from the Province of Varese